is a 1927 Japanese black and white silent comedy film directed by Tomiyasu Ikeda and stars Denjiro Okochi and Goro Kawabe, his senior at Nikkatsu. The film showcases the comic talent of Denjiro Okochi, which contrasts with his performance in Oatsurae Jirokichi Koshi.

Plot
Yaji and Kita are two goofy men, who are captured by the police and saved by a samurai, who is also later arrested, then they decide to save him.

Cast
Denjiro Okochi - Kita
Goro Kawabe - Yaji
Yoneko Sakai
Koichi Sakuragi

Versions
A 15-minute remnant of the film, which was originally 10-reels long, was released on DVD by Digital Meme with benshi accompaniment by Midori Sawato and Ryubi Kato.

References

External links

1927 films
Nikkatsu films
Japanese comedy films
Japanese silent films
Japanese black-and-white films
1927 comedy films